The Siemens C10 is a mobile phone made by Siemens in December 1997. The phone was available in four colours: Blue, yellow, red and grey. The C10 had a green backlit display capable of showing three lines. It weighed 165 g with battery and 117 g without.

References

External links 
 

Mobile phones introduced in 1997
C10